Mogote is an unincorporated community in Conejos County, in the U.S. state of Colorado.

The site is located on Colorado Highway 17 south of the Conejos River and  about four miles west of Antonito.

History
A post office called Mogote was established in 1897, and remained in operation until 1920. The community was named for Mogotes near the town site.

References

Unincorporated communities in Conejos County, Colorado
Unincorporated communities in Colorado